GURPS Cabal is a book by Kenneth Hite that features a customizable campaign setting for the GURPS role-playing game system, based on the first edition of GURPS Horror by Scott Haring and further developed in the second edition by J. M. Caparula.

Contents
GURPS Cabal depicts a modern-day secret society composed of vampires, lycanthropes and sorcerers who study the underlying principles of magic and visit other planes of existence and was integrated into Infinite Worlds, the "default" (core) setting for GURPS's 4th Edition.

Overview
The Cabal, unsurprisingly, has roots in the Jewish study of Kabbalah, though it has appropriated concepts from Egyptian occultism and elsewhere to create a syncretic system of Hermetic magic.

The Cabal is strictly regimented. From lowest to highest, the ranks are: (Outer Circle) Initiate, Novice, Adept; (Middle Circle) Theorist, Practitioner, Philosopher; (Inner Circle) Master and Grand Master.

There are thirteen Grand Masters, listed below. 
 Erzsébet Báthory, the Hungarian countess and vampire;
 Cagliostro, the Italian alchemist;
 John Dee, possibly history's greatest sorcerer;
 The Insidious Doctor Fang, the Oriental psionicist;
 Garravin, a legendary faerie warrior;
 Lord Kaas'sth'raa, a Serpent-Lord illusionist;
 Albert Garner Kavanagh III, owner of the technomagic Aeon Laboratories;
 Khaibitu-na-Khonsu, an ancient and completely insane Egyptian pharaoh;
 Koschei the Deathless, a fallen Slavic god;
 Marie Laveau, the Voodoo Queen of New Orleans;
 Oleupata Horsekiller, an ancient Scythian priestess;
 Erasmus Rooke, an eccentric magical engineer; and
 Athéne du Sarrazin, a beautiful German werewolf.
Many Cabalists speculate that there should be one more rank above that of Grand Master. The identity of the person with this rank is subject to many rumors.

Cosmology
In this setting, there are Four Realms of existence, based on the Jewish Sephiroth, or Tree of Life:
 Assiah, the Material: the ordinary world;
 Yetzirah, the Astral: the dreamworlds;
 Briah, the Iconic: home to various pagan deities and the thirty-six decans, or philosophical building blocks of the universe;
 Atziluth, the Spiritual: Heaven. 
Only the thirteen Grand Masters have ever visited Atziluth and been face-to-face with the creator of the universe. Suspiciously, none of them act particularly devout.

Publication history
GURPS Cabal is a soft-bound book written by Kenneth Hite and published in 2001 by Steve Jackson Games.

Reception

References

See also
 List of GURPS books

Campaign settings
Cabal
Horror role-playing games
Role-playing game supplements introduced in 2001
Vampires in games
Werewolf games